Axminster Monastery was a monastery in Devon, England. Cyneheard the Ætheling was buried in the minster.

References

Monasteries in Devon
Axminster